Rinaldo S. Brutoco (born in Toronto, Canada on February 27, 1947) is an attorney and corporate executive. He was raised in Southern California and has remained in California ever since.

Education 
In 1968, Brutoco graduated from Santa Clara University with a degree in Economics and Philosophy. He received a Juris Doctor from UCLA School of Law in 1971.

Career 
Brutoco founded the California Public Interest Law Center, which in 1972 won an appeal against the California Public Utilities Commission that resulted in a $143 million refund to customers of Pacific Telephone and Telegraph Company.

From 1992 to 2018, he served on the board of the Men's Wearhouse (now Tailored Brands). As a member of the Audit Committee, he helped take company public in 1992   He co-founded and was the Executive Vice President and Chief Operating Officer of Channel 100, the first pay cable television company in the world, which began operating in 1972. He served as the CEO and Chairman of the Red Rose Collection, a lifestyle mail order catalogue company The company was named three years in a row as an Inc. 500 Fastest Growing Company, and was the first catalogue company to sell A Course in Miracles.

Currently, Brutoco is the Principal and CEO of the ShangriLa Consulting Group, Inc. and Founder and CEO of Seven Oaks Ranch, an organic food and cosmetic manufacturer and distributor. He is also Founding Chairman of H2 Clipper, a company developing a hydrogen-powered dirigible.

He is also the Founding Chairman of The Optimist Daily, a free “positive news” service delivered daily and electronically to 30,000 subscribers.

Service 
In 1987, Brutoco founded the World Business Academy, a nonprofit business network and think tank.

From September 2009 to November 2010, he served as Chair of the Evolutionary Leaders Administrative Circle, part of the Evolutionary Leaders organization.

In 2013, Brutoco launched JUST Capital, an organization providing marketplace data for promoting and implementing  stakeholder capitalism, as a joint project of the World Business Academy and the Chopra Foundation. It was later  spun off as its own nonprofit, currently headquartered in New York CitIy. Brutoco continues to serve on its executive committee and to Chair both the Audit and Finance Committees

Awards 
He received a United States Congressional Commendation in 2010, the Ellis Island Medal of Honor in 2017, and the 2018 Santa Barbara United Nations Association Peace Prize.

Books 
Brutoco is the co-author  of Freedom From Mid-East Oil, a book about the confluence and possible outcomes of the crises of global warming, peak oil, and spiking world energy consumption.

He is also a co-author of Profiles in Power: The Anti-Nuclear Movement and the Dawn of the Solar Age (Simon & Schuster Macmillan, 1997), a book that profiles activists who challenge the nuclear energy industry, and conservationists and energy entrepreneurs exploring alternatives to both fossil fuel and nuclear energy.

In the 1990s, Brutoco was invited by Jeremy Tarcher to present an all-day seminar to a technology group with a series of remarks called Following that interaction, Brutoco co-created an anthology In 1993 he published with The New Paradigm in Business: Emerging Strategies for Leadership and Organizational Change (TaucherPerigee) based on a seminar he had previously given called  New Paradigms in Business.

References

External links 
 The Methane Accelerator (2019)
 Nuclear Power: Totally Unqualified to Combat Climate Change (2014)
 Business Warrior Monk: Core Principles (2019)
 The New Paradigm of Corporate Governance (2005)
 The Buck Stops Here
 Tribal Values – Guidelines for CEO Succession
 The Demise of the Imperial CEO

1947 births
Living people
Canadian businesspeople